Cookout may refer to:

 Another word for barbecue, used primarily in New England, and the northeastern US
 Cook Out (restaurant), a fast food chain based in North Carolina
 "Cookout (Space Ghost Coast to Coast)", an episode of Space Ghost Coast to Coast
 The Cookout, a 2004 film set around a cookout